Saartje Vandenbroucke (born 13 February 1996) is a Belgian racing cyclist, who currently rides for Belgian amateur team S-Bikes–AGU.

See also
 List of 2015 UCI Women's Teams and riders

References

External links

1996 births
Living people
Belgian female cyclists
Sportspeople from Ypres
Cyclists from West Flanders
21st-century Belgian women